{| align="right" class="toccolours"
|-
|colspan=2 align="center" |<big>'Palatinate-LauternPfalz-Lautern</big>
|-
|colspan=2 align="center" |1576–1592 
|-
|
|-
|width=138px| CapitalCircleBench|width=138px| LauternUpper RhenishCouncil of Princes
|-
|colspan=2 align="center" |
|-
|Partitioned from the Electorate of the Palatinate
|1576
|-
|Extinct; to the Electorate of the Palatinate
|1592
|-
|}Palatinate-Lautern''' was a state of the Holy Roman Empire based around Lautern and Neustadt an der Weinstrasse in the south of modern Rhineland-Palatinate, Germany.

Palatinate-Lautern was partitioned from the Electorate of the Palatinate in 1576 after the death of Frederick III, Elector Palatine for his younger son John Casimir. John Casimir accepted Huguenot refugees from France and Calvinist exiles from the Palatinate, making it a Calvinist stronghold. John Casimir was convinced by Queen Elizabeth I of England to establish a Protestant League in Germany against the Catholic states and the Holy Roman Emperor, making it one of the most influential states in its day. John Casimir died in 1592 without heirs, so Palatinate-Lautern was returned to the Palatinate which was ruled by his loved nephew, that under his regency had become an extremist calvist.

However, consequently to the balance of power between Catholics and Protestants, the State maintained its separate seat to the Reichstag.

History of the Palatinate (region)
House of Wittelsbach
Duchies of the Holy Roman Empire
Former states and territories of Rhineland-Palatinate